Fort Wint was part of the harbor defenses of Manila and Subic Bays built by the Philippine Department of the United States Army between 1907 and 1920 in response to recommendations of the Taft Board prior to the non-fortification clause of the Washington Naval Treaty.  Fort Wint was located on Grande Island at the entrance of Subic Bay, approximately 35 miles (56 km) north of Manila Bay. The fort was named for Brigadier General Theodore J. Wint. As specified in the National Defense Act of 1935, this was one of the locations where coastal artillery training was conducted.  A battery of the 60th Coast Artillery (AA) was stationed here.

Armament
Fort Wint was armed with fourteen Taft-Endicott period coast artillery pieces mounted in five batteries. Battery Warwick contained the fort's most powerful weaponry, two  M1895 disappearing guns on Buffington-Crozier carriages.  Batteries Hall and Woodruff each mounted two  M1905 guns, also on disappearing carriages. Batteries Flake and Jewell were armed with  M1903 guns on pedestal mounts.
As with other forts of the same period, the weaponry of Fort Wint was obsolete at the outbreak of hostilities with Japan in 1941.

World War II
In July 1941 minefields were laid at the entrance to Subic Bay. These included an Army controlled minefield operated from Fort Wint as well as naval mines, with the controlled Army mines in the ship channel, and naval mines to the sides of the channel. In December 1941 the bay entrance was ordered completely closed by Navy mines.

In the first week of January 1942, as Allied forces withdrew to the Bataan peninsula, Fort Wint was ordered abandoned and its crews reassigned to other American positions in Manila Bay. This was reportedly due to a mistake by the commander of the Northern Luzon Force. Consequently, the fort played no part in the subsequent siege of the island forts. Fort Wint was recaptured by U.S. forces in March 1945. The fort suffered substantial damage during the campaign to retake the Philippines .

Post-war

Grande Island and the remains of Fort Wint were incorporated into the U.S. Naval Base Subic Bay. The two  disappearing guns of Battery Warwick were dismantled by the United States Navy in the 1960s and shipped to Fort Casey in Washington state for renovation and display. The four  guns of Batteries Flake and Jewell were removed and divided between Forts Flagler and Casey in Washington state where they remain on display. The  guns of Battery Hall remain in place (pictures right). Grand Island was operated for many decades after WW II by Subic Bay US Navy Special Services as an on base resort for US Military and Civilians stationed throughout the Philippines. It was accessible via a small landing craft type boat shuttle service at the pier adjacent to the Alava Carrier Pier in front of the HQ building at Naval Station Subic Bay.  During Operation New Life, in 1975, thousands of Vietnamese refugees were sheltered and processed on Grande Island after the fall of Vietnam to North Vietnam. After that rescue mission, which lasted about six months, Grande Island was rehabilitated and was restored to its Special Services resort configuration until 1991. At that time the lease on US military bases expired, and the US bases were closed about the same time they were damaged by the eruption of Mount Pinatubo volcano. Grande Island was restored as a resort after repairs following damage from the Mount Pinatubo volcano eruption. It was restored by the civilian Philippine Subic Bay Free Port Zone Authority following the closure of the Subic Naval Base in 1992.

See also
 U.S. Naval Base Subic Bay
 Geography of the Philippines
 List of islands of the Philippines
 Military History of the Philippines
 Military History of the United States
 Seacoast defense in the United States
 United States Army Coast Artillery Corps

Notes

References

External links
 Grande Island Resort, Philippines
 Forts in the Philippines at American Forts Network
 Corregidor.org

Geography of Bataan
Closed installations of the United States Army
Wint
Wint
Buildings and structures in Bataan
Tourist attractions in Bataan